The Australian Nuclear Science and Technology Organisation (ANSTO) is a statutory body of the Australian government, formed in 1987 to replace the Australian Atomic Energy Commission. Its head office and main facilities are in southern outskirts of Sydney at Lucas Heights, in the Sutherland Shire.

Purpose
The Australian Nuclear Science & Technology Organisation (ANSTO) is Australia's national nuclear organisation and the centre of Australian nuclear expertise. The Australian Nuclear Science and Technology Organisation Act 1987 (Cth) prescribes its general purpose. The purpose is translated into action through corporate drivers of vision, mission and strategic goals.

Mission statement

 To support the development and implementation of government policies and initiatives in nuclear and related areas, domestically and internationally
 To operate nuclear science and technology based facilities, for the benefit of industry and the Australian and international research community
 To undertake research that will advance the application of nuclear science and technology
 To apply nuclear science, techniques and expertise to address Australia 's environmental challenges and increase the competitiveness of Australian industry
 To manufacture and advance the use of radiopharmaceuticals which will improve the health of Australians

Structure
ANSTO is governed by The Hon Dr Annabelle Bennett. Penelope Dobson is the Deputy Chair. The CEO, Shaun Jenkinson, manages the organisation.

ANSTO operates five research facilities:

 OPAL research reactor
 Centre for Accelerator Science
 Australian Centre for Neutron Scattering
 Cyclotron facility
 Australian Synchrotron

Major research instruments include:
 Particle accelerator, ANTARES
 High-resolution neutron powder diffractometer, ECHIDNA
 High-intensity neutron powder diffractometer, WOMBAT
 Strain scanner, KOWARI
 Neutron reflectometer, PLATYPUS

ANSTO also manufactures radiopharmaceuticals and performs commercial work such as silicon doping by nuclear transmutation.

Nuclear reactors
ANSTO currently has two nuclear reactors onsite: HIFAR and the OPAL from the Argentine company INVAP. HIFAR was permanently shut down on 30 January 2007. OPAL became operational in November 2006 and was officially opened 20 April 2007.

Spent fuel from the reactors is transported to Port Kembla, then shipped to France for reprocessing.

In 2017, ANSTO announced the creation of a NiMo-SiC alloy for use in molten salt reactors.

See also
Australian Radiation Protection and Nuclear Safety Agency
Australian Federal Police
Defence Science and Technology Organisation
Australian Safeguards and Non-proliferation Office

References

External links
Official ANSTO site
ANSTO reiterates nuclear waste dump safety
Chronology -- Australia's nuclear political history

Commonwealth Government agencies of Australia
Nuclear organizations
Scientific organisations based in Australia
Nuclear energy in Australia
Nuclear technology in Australia
Research institutes in Australia
Lucas Heights, New South Wales
1987 establishments in Australia